Óčko (stylised as Òĉko) is the first Czech music television channel, which started broadcasting in 2002.

Majority of the audience are teenagers and people from the 12–35 age group. The program consists of music videos of music from all different genres including the latest hits.

In addition to regular charts there are special shows, which concentrate only on certain music styles. The program also includes live concerts of Czech as well as foreign singers and bands. There is a big emphasis on interactivity. Up to 8 hours a day, the program is influenced by the viewers, who can either use email or SMS to vote for songs.

Óčko was also one of the first Czech television channels, which started fully broadcasting online. Internet users can therefore watch this channel for free and can choose the video quality to suit their connection speed. The best quality offers streaming video in 1.3 MB/s.

Óčko Music Awards
Also very popular are the Óčko Music Awards. In this annual events, viewers send SMS messages to vote in different categories, which are divided into Czech and World. The categories include Best male/female singer, Best band, Best HipHop, Best Rock, Best music video, Best Hard&Heavy, Best R&B, Best Pop and also the Best newcomer. The ceremony is gradually gaining prestige.

Shows
Some regular shows:
 Madhouse – metal music, talks with bands
 Inbox – interviews and talks, presented by Lenny Trčková
 Akcelerace ("acceleration") – music videos "for good mood"
 News – new music videos
 Trendy Face – professional stylists makeover random people from the street
 Cz & Sk – Czech and Slovak music videos
 Jízda ("drive") – music videos
 No Future – all about punk
 5th element – all about Hip hop
 Dojezd ("range") – nonstop music videos chosen by viewers
 Frisbee – all about Electro and Dance music
 Hitzone 80's – oldies
 Babylon – Latin music, reggae, blues
 BreakOut – less known bands and singers
 Cream – news from the music world (concerts, exhibitions, new albums, etc.)
 VIP Mix – a celebrity chooses music videos
 Official Czech Chart – Czech Top 40
 FlashIn – all about lifestyle (current world trends)
 Happy Tree Friends – animated series
 Hip Hop Don't Stop – Hip hop music
 Host Óčka ("Óčko's guest") – interview show, presented by Lenny Trčková
 Rock therapy – rock music
 Pelíšky slavných ("Beds of the famous") – a show similar to MTV's Cribs
 T-Music Chart – Viewer's Top 20

Sister channels Óčko

External links
 
 Information for journalists

Television in the Czech Republic
Television channels and stations established in 2002
2002 establishments in the Czech Republic
Television stations in the Czech Republic
Television broadcasting companies of the Czech Republic